Thaniyamangalam is a village in the Melur taluk of Madurai district, Tamil Nadu, India.
The sand is reddish due to rich iron.

Demographics 
Panchayat of Thaniyamangalam includes Bharathi nagar, Thethampatti, Perumalpatti and Muthuramalingampatti. As per the 2001 census, Thaniyamangalam had a total population of 3,748 with 1,757 males and 1,991 females. The literacy rate was 75.81. Agriculture is the major occupation (Paddy, Sugarcane, Banana). Later they fell into the trend of going to Gulf countries to earn.

Study Centres 
The village has a Government Primary School, Government Higher Secondary School and few Nursery Schools providing education for the children from in and around the village.

References 

Villages in Madurai district